The Wilkie Sugarloaf Trail is a hiking trail in northern Cape Breton Island in the Canadian province of Nova Scotia.  The trail leads to the  summit of Wilkie Sugar Loaf in the Cape Breton Highlands.

Trail outline
The trail offers two different mountain top look-offs. A trail to the summit has existed since at least 1969, probably much earlier.

The south-western look-off presents views toward the Pollets Cove-Aspy Fault Wilderness Area, the Aspy Fault plateau and Aspy Fault to the west, the plateau of the Cape Breton Highlands National Park in the distance to the south, as well as Aspy Harbour, the beach at Cabots Landing and the villages of Cape North and Dingwall to the south and east.

The northern look-off presents a view of the hills to the north and to the hamlets of Bay St. Lawrence and St. Margaret Village, the Bay St. Lawrence and the open Gulf of St. Lawrence beyond.

Trail access
The trail head is at 46°57'11.76"N, 60°27'39.66"W (N46 57.196 W060 27.661) and is marked by orange flagging tape and two yellow stones. This trail lies on privately owned land and is maintained by local volunteers.

Triangulation station

A Natural Resources Canada Geodetic Survey Division Station, Unique Number (Station Number): 23107, Station Name "SUGAR LOAF 19659", is located near the summit, consisting of a copper bolt sunk about 1 inch in a standard concrete monument. While the station can still be found, there are no remains of the tower.

Cape Breton Highlands 3 Peaks Challenge
While Wilkie Sugar Loaf trail has been regularly featured in the annual Hike the Highlands Festival since at least 2007, on July 17, 2010 the Wilkie Sugar Loaf trail was one of three mountain trails featured in the 1st Annual Cape Breton Highlands 3 Peaks Challenge, part of the Hike the Highlands Festival for 2010.  10 teams of 4 hikers climbed Franey, Wilkie Sugar Loaf and Acadien mountains in one day.

July 19, 2014 was the date of the 5th Annual Cape Breton Highlands 3 Peaks Challenge which once again featured Wilkie Sugar Loaf trail when 24 teams of 4 hikers hiked Roberts Mountain, Wilkie Sugar Loaf Mountain and Franey Mountain all in one day.  Wilkie Sugar Loaf was voted by the teams as the toughest mountain.  The Wilkie Sugar Loaf trail was cleared and re-flagged in early July 2014 in preparation for this event.

References

External links
Wilkie Sugar Loaf on Geocaching.com
Wilkie Sugar Loaf on TrailPeak.com
Wilkie Sugar Loaf on Moosebait.com

Hiking trails in Nova Scotia
Geography of Victoria County, Nova Scotia
Tourist attractions in Victoria County, Nova Scotia